Jichu Qullu (Aymara jichu ichu, Peruvian feather grass, qullu mountain, "ichu mountain", also spelled Ichocollo) is a mountain in the Andes of Peru which reaches a height of approximately . It is located in the Arequipa Region, Arequipa Province, Tarucani District.

References 

Mountains of Peru
Mountains of Arequipa Region